Wayne Township is one of the twenty-two townships of Knox County, Ohio, United States.  The 2010 census found 892 people in the township.

Geography
Located in the western part of the county, it borders the following townships:
Middlebury Township - north
Berlin Township - northeast corner
Morris Township - east
Clinton Township - southeast corner
Liberty Township - south
South Bloomfield Township, Morrow County - southwest corner
Chester Township, Morrow County - west
Franklin Township, Morrow County - northwest corner

Most of the village of Fredericktown occupies the northeastern corner of Wayne Township.

Name and history
Wayne Township was established in 1808. It is named for Anthony Wayne.

It is one of twenty Wayne Townships statewide.

Government
The township is governed by a three-member board of trustees, who are elected in November of odd-numbered years to a four-year term beginning on the following January 1. Two are elected in the year after the presidential election and one is elected in the year before it. There is also an elected township fiscal officer, who serves a four-year term beginning on April 1 of the year after the election, which is held in November of the year before the presidential election. Vacancies in the fiscal officership or on the board of trustees are filled by the remaining trustees.

References

External links
County website

Townships in Knox County, Ohio
Townships in Ohio